Lan is the Mandarin pinyin and Wade–Giles romanization of the Chinese surname written  in simplified Chinese and  in traditional Chinese. As of 2008, it is the 154th most common surname in China, shared by 840,000 people. Lan 蘭 is not listed in the Song dynasty classic text Hundred Family Surnames.

The people of the Xiongnu Lan (tribe) assimilated into Han Chinese culture and were given the surname Lan.

Notable people surnamed Lan
This is a Chinese name, meaning the surname is stated  the given name, though Chinese persons living in Western countries will often put their surname after their given name.

 Consort Lan (兰淑仪; 4th century), mother of Murong Chui, founding emperor of Later Yan
 Lan Han (蘭汗; died 398), Later Yan official who briefly usurped the throne
 Princess Lan (蘭王妃; 4th–5th century), wife of Murong Sheng, emperor of Later Yan
 Lan Qin (蘭欽), Liang dynasty general
 Lan Jing (蘭京; died 549), son of Lan Qin, assassinated Gao Cheng, emperor of Northern Qi
 Lan Mao (蘭茂; 1397–1470) Ming dynasty poet and author on medicine, who is the namesake of the fungal genus Lanmaoa
 Lan Dixi (蘭第錫; 1736–1797), Qing dynasty Vice Minister of War
 Lan Pu (兰浦; 19th century), Qing dynasty author
 Lan Fu (兰馥; 1885–1964), general of the Yunnan clique
 Lan Xichun (兰锡纯; 1907–1995), pioneering surgeon
 Lan Lijun (兰立俊), Chinese ambassador to Indonesia, Canada, and Sweden
 Lan Shili (兰世立; born 1966), founder and former CEO of East Star Airlines
 Lan Xuan (蘭萱; born 1966), Taiwanese TV presenter
 Lan Wei (蘭衛; born 1968), Olympic diver
 Lan Boning (兰泊宁; born 1971), novelist
 Lan Ya Ming (兰雅明; 1972-2002), Chinese teacher and murder victim who was killed in Singapore
 Lan Xiaolong (兰晓龙; born 1973), screenwriter and novelist
 Lan Lixin (兰丽新; born 1979), middle-distance runner
 Lan Yu (兰玉; born 1986), fashion designer
 Lan Xing (兰兴; born 1990), Olympic shooter

References

Chinese-language surnames
Individual Chinese surnames
Chinese-language surnames not found in the Hundred Family Surnames